Somewhere in Sonora is a 1927 American silent Western film directed by Albert S. Rogell and written by Marion Jackson. It is based on the 1925 novel Somewhere South in Sonora by Will Levington Comfort. The film stars Ken Maynard, Kathleen Collins, Frank Leigh, Joseph Bennett, Charles Hill Mailes and Carl Stockdale. The film was released on April 3, 1927, by First National Pictures.

Cast  
 Ken Maynard as Bob Bishop
 Kathleen Collins as Mary Burton
 Frank Leigh as Monte Black
 Joseph Bennett as Bart Leadley 
 Charles Hill Mailes as Mexicali Burton
 Carl Stockdale as Bob Leadley
 Yvonne Howell as Patsy
 Richard Neill as Ramón Bistula
 Ben Corbett as 'Sockeye' Kelly
 Monte Montague as 'Kettle Belly' Simpson
 Tarzan as Tarzan

References

External links
 

1927 films
1920s English-language films
1927 Western (genre) films
First National Pictures films
Films directed by Albert S. Rogell
American black-and-white films
Silent American Western (genre) films
1920s American films